Darrell C. Scott is an American pastor, radio station owner/host, and a former advisor to President Donald Trump. He is a co-founder of the New Spirit Revival Center in Cleveland Heights, Ohio. He is a co-founder, along with Michael D. Cohen, and board member of the National Diversity Coalition for Trump.

Early life

According to his statements at a rally for President Trump, Scott aspired as a child to be a drug dealer and pimp. Scott sold drugs, used cocaine, stole automobiles and was expelled from school at the age of 16 for bringing his father's 9mm on campus. While in his 20s, Scott became a born-again Christian after he and his wife were urged to attend church by a neighbor.

In 2004, Scott received an honorary doctorate from St. Thomas Christian College in Jacksonville, Florida. The college is not nationally accredited, though it is registered as a religious institution by the Florida Department of Education. During his career, Scott has used the "Dr." honorific on his website and claimed to have earned a doctoral degree.

Career

Scott is the founder and pastor of New Spirit Revival Center in Cleveland Heights, Ohio, which owns radio station WCCD AM 1000 in Cleveland, where Scott has a daily program.

Role in the 2016 presidential election

Scott met Donald Trump in 2011 after being invited to Trump Tower, when Trump was considering a run for president. After Trump announced his candidacy, Scott was one of the first African-American pastors to support Trump and a key figure in leading other African-American pastors to attend meetings at Trump Tower. In 2016, Scott and Donald Trump's personal attorney and campaign spokesperson Michael D. Cohen co-founded National Diversity Coalition for Trump, that began operations in April, 2016. The group's advisory board has leaders from American-Muslims for Trump, African-American Pastors for Trump, and Korean-Americans for Trump. Scott introduced Trump at a rally at Cleveland I-X Center before the Ohio Republican primary and later hosted Trump at his church with a large group of pastors in attendance, the event aired on Fox News Hannity show. In July, 2016, on the third day of the Republican National Convention, Scott was a keynote speaker in support of Donald Trump's nomination for the Republican Party, Scott stated in his speech that the "Democrat party has failed us".

Post-2016 election

After the election, Scott gave an interview to National Public Radio and described the Democratic Party as "pimps" who "pimped out the inner city" like a "pimp stands next to a prostitute".

On November 30, 2016, President Trump selected Scott to be part of his executive transition team. Scott publicly thanked Trump on Twitter, which resulted in a backlash on social media. Scott was called an Uncle Tom and was accused of taking money in exchange for his support of President Donald Trump.

In January 2017, CNN's Marc Lamont Hill characterized Scott and other members of Trump's diversity team as "mediocre Negroes" during a Don Lemon CNN Tonight segment.

On February 1, 2017, President Donald Trump responded with enthusiasm during a White House Black History Month event, to Scott's suggestion that gang leaders in Chicago wanted to meet to help reduce gun violence.

On April 18, 2017, Scott hosted a meeting at the Washington hotel with six Chicago residents that hope to start a community service called "Stronger Together", to rehabilitate housing and start new technical high schools teaching skills such as producing rap music.

On August 1, 2018, Scott said during a White House gathering of faith leaders that he thinks President Trump will be "the most pro-black president" in his lifetime.

Post-2020 election
During the ongoing 2020 election, Scott falsely claimed that votes were stopped from being counted. Five days after the 2020 election, Scott baselessly stated that fraud caused President Trump's loss, but he also cited Trump's "unforced errors", including how he talked about the COVID-19 pandemic, saying, "I can't be upset if we shoot ourselves in the foot."

Television appearances

Scott has appeared as a commentator on networks Fox News, MSNBC, and CNN.

Issues and controversies

On February 2, 2017, Scott said he had "misspoke" at the White House due to lack of sleep, when he stated Chicago's "top gang thugs" would "lower the body count" if new federal programs were provided. On March 3, 2017, WEWS-TV Channel 5 Cleveland reported Scott was being sued for back rent on a home; Scott referred to the claim as "fake". Courthouse News Service reported the breach is of a formal land contract and not a lease option.

Personal life

Scott is married to Belinda Scott.

References

External links
Profile on New Spirit Revival Center website

Year of birth missing (living people)
Living people
African-American Christian clergy
Religious leaders from Cleveland
Ohio Republicans
Conservatism in the United States
21st-century African-American people